Verba is a village in Dubno Raion, Rivne Oblast, Ukraine. In 2001, the community had 2,863 residents.

History 
The first written records noting this area are contained in Privilege of King Casimir IV Jagiellon, written to Denisko Mukosi Yovich in Zbarazh and villages of Zbarazh Volost (for the term of life) "for safe service", given by designation Gentlemen-advice from January 12, 1442, in which the village is noted among others.

In 1518, the village was elevated by decree to city status by King Sigismund I the Old.

In 1545, the village was mentioned in the review of Kremenets castle, noting that the proprietors of the villages of Bereh and Verba retained one of Gooden. The proprietor of Verba was Zhej Kanevskiy.

In 1549, the village was purchased by Mykhailo Dashkovich Elovich-Malinsky. In 1564, he won a local privilege on the foundation of the township and the right to arrange weekly auctions and a semi-annual fair. In the western part of Verba, where the roads to Kremenets, Dubno, Kozyn, and Brody intersected, he erected a town hall/house of arrivals. A township was surrounded by an earthen billow. Part of Verba outside the billow remains in a portion of the village. Part of the village, which had a status of township was remains an active center.

In 1774, the village population was 1,282. Verba is noted by a church in the village, "List of all postal stations in Volhynian Governorate”. It was related that a postal/passenger highway passed through. A post-house stabled 34 horses.

After the division of Poland in 1793, the territory that contains Verba was ruled by the Russian Empire. A township was the center of volost in Dubno Uyezd of the Volhynian Governorate.

In obedience to the Brockhaus and Efron Encyclopedic Dictionary (published in Imperial Russia, 1890–1907) 124 yards were counted in the township Verba. With a population of 1068, it hosted railhead, 9 shops, 8 coaching inns, a Russian Orthodox church, and a synagogue.

References

External links 
 Verba in public library. 

Villages in Dubno Raion
Volhynian Governorate
Wołyń Voivodeship (1921–1939)